Mark Anthony Hill (born 27 July 1964) is an Australian former cricketer, who played first class cricket and List A cricket for the Tasmania cricket team in the 1985/86 season. He was a right-arm fast-medium bowler.

References

External links
 

1964 births
Living people
Australian cricketers
Tasmania cricketers
Cricketers from Perth, Western Australia
Sportsmen from Western Australia